Al-Ṭufayl ibn ʿAmr al-Dawsī (Arabic: الطفيل بن عمرو الدوسي) (died 633) was the chief of the Banu Daws tribe from Tihama in pre-Islamic times.

Career
He accepted Islam around four years before the hijra in 622 CE and helped spread Islam among his fellow tribesmen. During the Ridda wars, he led a contingent of his people against the impostor Mosailima. In the Battle of Yamama, Tufayl ibn Amr fell as a martyr.

It is narrated in the books of hadiths that when he traveled to Makkah for HAJJ, as usual, he was warned by Makkans not to approach or listen to Mohammad. They told him Mohammad is a magician. Tufail was so worried that he put cotton wools in his ears in order to avoid hearing Mohammad Tufail was doing tawaf when he saw Mohammad reciting a part of Quran. Tufail was curious and thought that he is the head of his tribe, a smart man and therefore how a magician will take over him so he removed the cotton wools and came close to Mohammad and listened to the Quran.

References

Companions of the Prophet
633 deaths
Medieval Arabs killed in battle
Year of birth unknown